The Lompoc Record is a newspaper in the town of Lompoc, California.

Donrey Media acquired the paper in 1979; it became part of the MediaNews Group-led California Media Partnership in 1999. Pulitzer bought the paper in 2001. Lee Enterprises bought Pulitzer in 2005 and was sold to Santa Maria News Media Inc. in March 2020.

References

External links
 

Weekly newspapers published in California
1875 establishments in California